Fotadrevo is a rural municipality in southwestern Madagascar. It belongs to the district of Ampanihy, which is a part of Atsimo-Andrefana Region. The population of the commune was estimated to be approximately 35,000 in 2001 commune census.

Primary and junior level secondary education are available in town. The majority 60% of the population of the commune are farmers, while an additional 30% receives their livelihood from raising livestock. The most important crop is rice, while other important products are peanuts, cassava and onions.  Industry and services provide employment for 1% and 9% of the population, respectively.

Mining
The Molo mine is situated 11.5 km North-north-east of Fotadrevo.

References and notes 

Populated places in Atsimo-Andrefana
Ampanihy Ouest (district)